Joe Ely is the 1977 debut album by Texas singer-songwriter, Joe Ely. The album includes several tracks written by Ely's bandmates in the Flatlanders.

Joe Ely and the follow-up album, Honky Tonk Masquerade, helped establish Ely as a solo artist. Although the reissued CD doesn't credit Ely's backing musicians, the original LP included a one-page insert containing lyrics and musician credits. The core of the backing band that Ely had assembled for his debut was the same Lubbock-based crack team that appeared with him the following year on Honky Tonk Masquerade and continued to follow him on the road until 1982.

Years later Ely would recall that the band had not initially made plans for a recording career:
"We had recorded some songs at [Don] Caldwell's studio," Ely said. "Don took that tape to Jerry Jeff Walker, and Jerry Jeff recorded one of the songs and played it for a guy with MCA Records. Then one night in 1975 at the Cotton Club, an A&R guy with MCA asked, 'Do y'all want to make some records?'"

"I told him we'd sure never planned on it. But we hadn't planned anything else either, so why not?"

Track listing
All tracks composed by Joe Ely; except where indicated
Side 1
"I Had My Hopes Up High" - 3:32
"Mardi Gras Waltz" - 2:50
"She Never Spoke Spanish To Me" (Butch Hancock) - 3:34
"Gambler's Bride" - 2:35
"Suckin' A Big Bottle Of Gin" (Butch Hancock) - 3:15
Side 2
"Tennessee's Not The State I'm In" (Butch Hancock) - 3:04
"If You Were A Bluebird" (Butch Hancock) - 2:59
"Treat Me Like A Saturday Night" (Jimmie Dale Gilmore) - 3:02
"All My Love" - 3:09
"Johnny Blues" - 4:10

Personnel
The following credits are summarized from track-by-track credits listed in the album's liner notes.

Musicians
Bass - Gregg Wright
Drum - Steve Keeton
Piano, electric piano, clavinet, organ - Bobby Emmons
Electric guitars - Joe Ely, Rick Hulett, Jesse Taylor, Chip Young
Acoustic guitars - Ray Edenton, Joe Ely, Rick Hulett, Lloyd Maines, Chip Young
Gut guitar, 12-string guitar - Jesse Taylor
F-hole guitar - Ray Edenton
Steel guitar - Lloyd Maines
Dobros - Rick Hulett, Jesse Taylor
Slide dobro - Joe Ely ("Treat Me Like A Saturday Night")
Harmonica - Joe Ely
Percussion - Farrell Morris
Horns - The Muscle Shoals Group
Trumpet - Harrison Callaway
Tenor saxophone - Harvey Thompson
Baritone saxophone - Ron Eades
Trombone - Charles Rose
Vocal harmonies - Joe Ely ("Johnny Blues"), Rick Hulett ("Mardi Gras Waltz", "She Never Spoke Spanish", "Tennessee", "All My Love")

Production
Recorded at Young 'Un Sound Studios, Murfreesboro, Tennessee
Engineer – Chip Young
Mastered at MCA Recording Studio, Universal City, California
Mastering Engineer – Larry Boden

Artwork
Cover illustration – Paul Milosevich
Back cover photo (of Ely and band in cafe) – Jim Eppler

Releases
The album was digitally remastered and released on CD and cassette in 1991.
In 2000, a remastered edition of Ely's first two albums (Joe Ely and Honky Tonk Masquerade) were released together on a single disk. Dirty Linen reported that this disk was especially worth seeking out since it was (at least at the time), "the only place on two continents you can get Ely's debut."  The reviewer described Ely's first two albums together: "Ely's self-titled effort and HTM are a bit leaner than most of his other honky-tonk rockers, with a bit more piano than electric guitar backing his lonesome warble -- dry and forceful as the wind whistling through Waco."

Notes and sources 

1977 debut albums
Joe Ely albums
MCA Records albums